Fernand Nisot (11 April 1895 – 31 July 1973) was a Belgian association football player who competed in the 1920 Summer Olympics. When he played the first time for the national soccer team, he was the youngest player ever: only 16 years and 19 days old. He was a member of the Belgian team which won the gold medal in the football tournament.

References

External links
 profile
 

1895 births
1973 deaths
Belgian footballers
Footballers at the 1920 Summer Olympics
Olympic footballers of Belgium
Olympic gold medalists for Belgium
Belgium international footballers
Olympic medalists in football
Medalists at the 1920 Summer Olympics
Association football forwards
20th-century Belgian people